Charles Cyril Bunyan Jr. (22 November 1892 – 1975) was an English professional football player and manager. During his time in Belgium, he was known as Cyrille Bunyan.

Career

Playing career
Bunyan played in Belgium for Racing Club de Bruxelles (where he scored 12 goals in 55 games, and in England for Chelsea.

Coaching career
Bunyan replaced his father as manager of Anderlecht in 1922, following the latter's death.

Personal life
He was the son of Charles Bunyan Sr. and brother of Maurice Bunyan.

References

1892 births
1975 deaths
English footballers
English football managers
Chelsea F.C. players
English Football League players
R.S.C. Anderlecht managers
K.F.C. Rhodienne-De Hoek players
Association footballers not categorized by position
English expatriate football managers
English expatriate footballers
Expatriate footballers in Belgium
English expatriate sportspeople in Belgium